Tower of Love is a 1974 XXX comedy film directed by George Drazich and written by Harriet Foster. The film was originally distributed by Harry Novak through his VIP label, and was subsequently revived by Something Weird Video.

Synopsis

American models accept a job overseas, attending the Crotavian bicentennial celebration; their employers insist that they wear chastity belts at all times.

Cast
 Jean Pascal
 Antoinette Maynard (a.k.a. Lilly Foster)
 Carol Hawkins		
 Tammy Smith		
 Kitty Lombard		
 Tommy Walker		
 Joseph Peters		
 Gene Rowland
 Alan Land		
 Mary Valentine		
 March Embers		
 Bob Boneto		
 Floyd Martin		
 Bert Davis
 Bob Silvani
 Keith Erickson
 Kristy Fletcher
 George 'Buck' Flower
 Penny King
 Paul Scharf
 Kay White

References

External links

1974 films
1974 comedy films
1970s English-language films